Jan Van Esbroeck (born 30 September 1968 in Mechelen) is a Belgian politician and is affiliated to the N-VA. He was elected as a member of the Belgian Chamber of Representatives in 2010.

Notes

Living people
Members of the Chamber of Representatives (Belgium)
New Flemish Alliance politicians
1968 births
Politicians from Mechelen
21st-century Belgian politicians